Leptospermum glaucescens, commonly known as the blue-green tea tree or smoky tea tree, is a species of shrub or small tree that is endemic to Tasmania.

Description
Leptospermum glaucescens is a shrub or small tree that has flaky bark and young stems that are hairy when young. There are broad, brownish bracts at the base of the flower bud but that fall off as the flower develops.

Taxonomy and naming
Leptospermum glaucescens was first formally described in 1841 by Sebastian Schauer in the journal Linnaea: ein Journal für die Botanik in ihrem ganzen Umfange, oder Beiträge zur Pflanzenkunde. Schauer's description was based on specimens grown in the botanic garden in Breslau from seed donated by Berlin Botanic Garden, but extensive searches have failed to locate Schauer's type specimens.

In 1806, Jacques Labillardière described Leptospermum sericeum in Novae Hollandiae Plantarum Specimen from specimens collected "in capite Van-Diemen" and this name was applied to plants collected in Tasmania. However, Labillardière had confused "Van-Diemen" with "Terre Van-Leuwin", and although he later made the correction on the herbarium sheet in Paris, the name L. sericeum continued to be applied to plants collected in Tasmania. Although in 1844 Johannes Conrad Schauer noted in Plantae Preissianae (in Latin) "in Van Leuwin's Land, not on Van Diemen's Island", the correction was not made until 1967 with the publication of James Hamlyn Willis's paper in the journal Muelleria. Leptospermum sericeum is a Western Australian endemic, found near Esperance, which has pink, sessile flowers and does not grow to the height of L. glaucescens.

Distribution and habitat
The blue-green tea tree grows in wet heath and is widespread in Tasmania.

References

glaucescens
Myrtales of Australia
Flora of Tasmania
Plants described in 1841